Marek Boháč (born 31 October 1988) is a Czech football goalkeeper who last played for Pardubice.

References

External links
 
 
 
 

1988 births
Living people
Czech footballers
Association football goalkeepers
Czech First League players
FK Viktoria Žižkov players
FC Sellier & Bellot Vlašim players
Czech National Football League players
1. FK Příbram players
FK Pardubice players
Footballers from Prague